Superbolt may refer to:

An unusually powerful lightning bolt
A multi-jackbolt tensioner
The bubbletop version of the Republic P-47 Thunderbolt